Craspedus is a genus of beetles.

Placement 
Craspedus is uncontroversially placed in the tribe Osoriini of the subfamily Osoriinae.

Distribution 
Craspedus is indigenous to the Neotropical region (Brazil and Mexico).

References 

 Irmler, U. 2009: A second species for the genus Craspedus Bernhauer, 1908 from the Neotropical region (Coleoptera: Staphylinidae, Osoriinae). Dugesiana (ISSN 1405-4094 eISSN 2007-9133, check ISSN 1028-3420), 16(2): 75–78. Full article (PDF)

External links 
 iNaturalist

Staphylinidae genera
Osoriinae